Frederick K. C. Price (January 3, 1932 – February 12, 2021) was an American televangelist and author who was the founder and apostle of Crenshaw Christian Center (CCC), located in South Los Angeles, California. He was known for his Ever Increasing Faith ministries broadcast, which aired weekly on television and radio.

Early life
Price was born in 1932 in Santa Monica, California, a Los Angeles suburb, the eldest son of Winifred and Frederick Price, Sr., who owned a janitorial service in West Los Angeles. Frederick attended McKinley Elementary School in Santa Monica, Foshay Junior High, Manual Arts High School and Dorsey High School in Los Angeles, and then completed two years of schooling at Los Angeles City College. He later received an honorary diploma from the Rhema Bible Training Center (1976) and an honorary Doctor of Divinity degree from Oral Roberts University (1982).

Both of his parents, who had once been practicing Jehovah's Witnesses at the time he met his future wife Betty, had stopped practicing the religion, and were also outspoken against all organized religions. While courting Betty, his high school sweetheart, he began attending church services with her. However, after their marriage, he stopped attending church regularly until a group of Los Angeles-area churches began sponsoring a week of old-fashioned tent revivals in the Crenshaw area. Price began attending these services with his wife. At one of these services, he received Jesus Christ as his personal savior. Soon after becoming born again, Price claimed to have felt the call from God to go into the ministry, serving mostly part-time, while working as a paper cutter, as an assistant pastor in a Baptist church from 1955 to 1957. He then pastored an African Methodist Episcopal church in Val Verde, California from 1957 to 1959. In the early 1960s, Price served at Westminster Presbyterian Church in Los Angeles. Price then joined the Christian and Missionary Alliance at West Washington Community Church in 1965.

Ministry work
In February 1970, Price has claimed he received the baptism of the Holy Spirit, and also said he spoke in tongues, a time which he considered the starting point in his own ministry. Shortly thereafter, he encountered the Bible-teaching ministry of late preacher/televangelist Kenneth E. Hagin. Price joined the neo-charismatic movement, affiliating with Word of Faith, and began to teach the messages on speaking in tongues, divine healing, and prosperity teachings. He and his wife Betty co-founded the Crenshaw Christian Center that same year in the Crenshaw section of West Los Angeles, California.

Crenshaw Christian Center
In November 1973, Price moved with about 300 church members from West Washington in Los Angeles in order to establish the Crenshaw Christian Center in Inglewood, California. Membership continued to grow, and in 1977 the church was forced to hold two services, with another service added in 1982, because the 1,400-seat sanctuary was always filled to capacity. In 1981, the church bought the old Pepperdine University campus. After the purchase, Price oversaw construction of a new sanctuary, called the "FaithDome", which at the time was the largest domed church in the United States.

Ground was broken for the FaithDome on September 28, 1986, and construction began on January 5, 1987. Construction was completed in 1989 on the 10,146-seat dome at a cost of more than $10 million. At the time of its dedication on January 21, 1990, the dome and the church's property were both fully paid for, leaving the ministry debt-free.

Christian Word of Faith Ministries
In 1990, Price founded the Fellowship of International Christian Word of Faith Ministries (FICWFM), which includes churches and ministers from all over the United States and several other countries. They meet regionally throughout the year and hold a major annual convention. Price was a Word of Faith teacher.

Family and personal life
Price married the former Betty Ruth Scott, whom he met while attending Dorsey High School, in 1953. They had five children. (one child died during childhood)

Death
Price died from complications of COVID-19 at a hospital in Los Angeles on February 12, 2021, at the age of 89.

Selected books written by Price
 Faith, Foolishness, or Presumption?, 160 pages, Publisher: Harrison House, Incorporated, Publication date: January 1, 1981
 How to Obtain Strong Faith: Six Principles, 192 pages, Publisher: Harrison House, Incorporated, Publication date: August 28, 1982
 Homosexuality: State of Birth or State of Mind?, First Edition, Pub. Date: September 1, 1989, Publisher: Harrison House, 
 Faith's Greatest Enemies, Paperback, Publisher: Harrison House, Incorporated, Publication date: January 2, 1995
 Race, Religion and Racism, Vol. 1, First Edition, Pub. Date: July 1999, Publisher: Anchor Distributors, 
 The Christian Family: Practical Insight for Family Living, 318 pages, Publisher: Faith One Publishing, Publication date: July 28, 2002
 How Faith Works, Paperback, 301 pages, Publisher: Faith One Publishing, Publication date: July 28, 2002
 The Holy Spirit: The Helper We All Need, Paperback, Publisher: Faith One Publishing, Publication date: July 28, 2002
 Race, Religion and Racism, Vol. 2, First Edition, Publisher: Anchor Distributors, Publication date: January 7, 2003
 Answered Prayer Guaranteed!: The Power of Praying with Faith, 224 pages, Publisher: Charisma Media, Publication date: August 28, 2006
 Prosperity: Good News for God's People, 192 pages, Publisher: Strang Communications Company, Publication date: January 28, 2008

See also 

 Price v. Stossel
 Pentecostalism
 Glossolalia

References

External links 
 Biography at Crenshaw Christian Center

1932 births
2021 deaths
20th-century American male writers
20th-century American non-fiction writers
21st-century American male writers
21st-century American non-fiction writers
African-American Christian clergy
African-American non-fiction writers
American Christian clergy
American Pentecostal pastors
American television evangelists
Christian writers
Deaths from the COVID-19 pandemic in California
Pentecostals from California
People from Los Angeles
Writers from Santa Monica, California
Susan Miller Dorsey High School alumni
Writers from Los Angeles
21st-century African-American people